Jodbajab (1873 or 1877–1945) was a military officer and government official in the Inner Mongolia area under China's late Qing Dynasty and Mengjiang governments. He was an ethnic Mongol belonging to the Plain and Bordered White Banner of Xilin Gol League.

Names
Historical sources refer to him under a variety of names:
Jodubjab or Jodubdjabu, Roman spellings of his Mongolian name based on the Classical Mongolian alphabet
Jodovjav, a transcription of Mongolian Cyrillic Жодовжав
Shih Hai ( or ), his Chinese courtesy name
Tso Shih-hai, a Chinese name which takes the first character of the Chinese transcription of his Mongolian name (less commonly ), followed by his Chinese courtesy name

Career
During the Xinhai Revolution which overthrew the Qing, Khalkha Mongol banners declared independence as the state of Mongolia and occupied Dariganga, which was then under Jodubjab's jurisdiction. This occurred in March 1912. He led an attack in an attempt to recover the area, but on 28 August was taken prisoner and held in Urga (today Ulan Bator). He would be released in 1915 under the terms of the Treaty of Kyakhta (1915). After his return to Inner Mongolia, he was commended by Yuan Shikai's government and commissioned a lieutenant-general. From there he rose to become the senior amban in Chahar Province. During the Outer Mongolian Revolution of 1921, he was dispatched in another attempt to re-establish control in Dariganga, but was driven out by Soviet Kalmyk troops and local partisans; the territory would thenceforth remain part of the state of Mongolia.

In March 1934, Jodubjab was appointed a member of the Nanjing government's newly established Mongolian Local Autonomous Political Committee, along with Kesingge, Serengdongrub, Ünenbayan, and Nima-odsor of the Kuomintang, and various league and banner nobility such as Altanochir, Darijaya, and Gorjorjab (郭尔卓尔扎布). However, in early 1936, Nima-odsor, who was Jodubjab's close friend and advisor, was assassinated by the Japanese for his Mongol nationalism and opposition to Japanese expansionism. In response, Jodubajab, intimidated, began to collaborate with Japan's territorial designs on Inner Mongolia, sparking the ire of Mongol nationalists. In his position as commander of the Mongol militia, he endorsed Prince Demchigdongrob's telegram announcing the establishment of the Mengjiang government. In February of that year, he and Li Shouxin seized control of the postal administration in six districts of eastern Chahar Province. In November of that year, he participated in the Suiyuan Campaign. In 1937 he was appointed one of two deputy commanders of the Mongol Pao An Tui (蒙古保安隊) along with Pao Yueh-ching (包悦卿).

Jodubajab was captured during the Soviet invasion of Manchuria during the final days of World War II and again taken to Ulan Bator as a prisoner, where he died.

References

Bibliography

1870s births
1945 deaths
Year of birth uncertain

Mengjiang
Military personnel of the Republic of China
History of Inner Mongolia
Republic of China politicians from Inner Mongolia
Prisoners and detainees of Mongolia
Mongol collaborators with Imperial Japan
People from Xilingol League